The North–South Expressway Northern Route  is an interstate controlled-access highway running parallel to the northwestern coast of Peninsular Malaysia. The  expressway forms the north section of the North–South Expressway, passing through the northwestern states of Kedah, Penang, Perak and Selangor. The expressway begins at the Bukit Kayu Hitam checkpoint in Kedah where the Malaysia–Thailand border lies, and ends at Bukit Lanjan in Selangor where the expressway interchanges with the New Klang Valley Expressway. The expressway is operated by PLUS Expressways.

The expressway runs in a north–south direction close to the northwestern coast of the peninsula, connecting several major towns including Alor Setar, George Town, Seberang Perai, Taiping, Ipoh and Rawang while also providing access to several rural villages on its path. The expressway runs parallel to the existing Federal Route 1; it is also concurrent to the expressway from Bukit Kayu Hitam to Jitra. The ticket system is used for toll collection between the Hutan Kampung and Sungai Dua toll plazas, and also from the Juru toll plaza up to Bukit Lanjan, where the toll collection system merges with that of the New Klang Valley Expressway. The section from Sungai Dua to Juru in the state of Penang is toll-free due to heavy usage by local commuters to access Penang Bridge. In the vicinity of Ipoh, the section between Jelapang and Ipoh South features a local-express lane system.

This is the longest expressway in Peninsular Malaysia.

Route description 
The expressway begins at the Malaysia–Thailand border at Bukit Kayu Hitam in Kedah, where the road continues as Phetkasem Road in Thailand. The expressway proceeds southwards through the states of Kedah, Penang, Perak and Selangor, where it terminates at its interchange with the New Klang Valley Expressway, also designated as route E1. While kilometre readings are taken from north to south, exits are numbered in reverse, from south to north. PLUS Expressways, previously Projek Lebuhraya Utara–Selatan (PLUS) formed in 1986, operates and maintains the expressway. The concession is scheduled to end on 31 December 2038.

Features

Notable features
Its main features include the Penang Bridge which is Malaysia's second longest bridge, Sungai Perak Bridge (Jambatan Sultan Azlan Shah), Menora Tunnel and the North-South Expressway Monument at Rawang Rest and Service Area (R&R) (North bound).

The Gopeng-Tapah section is the most expensive section of the North-South Expressway network. It can be considered as a dangerous stretches.

There are two dangerous stretches along the expressway, the Changkat Jering-Ipoh North (Jelapang) and Gopeng-Tapah sections.

The Gopeng Rural Transformation Centre (RTC) Rest and Service Area (RSA) is the first expressway RTC rest and service area in Malaysia. The RTC rest and service area is located near Simpang Pulai Layby north bound of the North–South Expressway Northern Route.

Restricted routes for heavy vehicles
During workdays or peak hours. There is a restricted routes at the North–South Expressway Northern Route from Rawang (South) to Bukit Lanjan. Heavy vehicles (except buses and tankers) with laden and unladen heavy vehicles weighing 10,000 kg or more are not allowed to enter the expressway between 6:30 am until 9:30 am on Monday to Friday (except public holidays). A compound fines will be issued to heavy vehicles which flouted the rule.

Current developments

Kuala Lumpur-Penang Through Traffic (Ipoh North (Jelapang) - Ipoh South local-express lanes)
The Jelapang and Ipoh South toll plazas would be demolished in 2009 to make a non-stop route across Ipoh. This is achieved through the construction of two local-express lanes for each side, which are only accessible via Exit 138 Ipoh South Exit (for northbound traffic) and Exit 141 Ipoh North Exit (for southbound traffic). The toll plazas in Ipoh are therefore relocated at each ends of the local-express lanes.

The decision to demolish both toll plazas was made as a result of accidents which happened at Jelapang toll plaza. Since the toll plaza was opened on 28 September 1987, there were many accident cases which involved brake failure in heavy vehicles due to hard braking when proceeding downhill to the toll plaza. On 7 June 2008, the new Ipoh North toll plaza (South bound) replacing old Jelapang toll plaza opened to traffic, followed by north bound on 15 August 2008. Beginning 11:00 am on 14 July 2009, the Kuala Lumpur-Penang through traffic is now opened to traffic.

Six-lane widening works

Phase 1: Rawang-Tanjung Malim
The 6-lane stretch which is currently running from Kuala Lumpur (including New Klang Valley Expressway (NKVE)) to Rawang Interchange Exit 116 would be expanded to Tanjung Malim Interchange Exit 121.

Phase 2: Tanjung Malim-Slim River
Meanwhile, in the next phase of these works, the 6-lane stretch would be expanded from Tanjung Malim Interchange Exit 121 to Slim River Interchange Exit 126.

Exit 117 Sungai Buaya Interchange
An interchange at Sungai Buaya, Selangor, between Rawang and Bukit Beruntung Interchange was constructed between 2011 and 2013. This new interchange was opened to traffic on 10 January 2014.

Exit 152 Alor Pongsu Interchange
An interchange at Alor Pongsu, Perak, between Bandar Baharu and Bukit Merah Interchange was opened on 7 June 2016.

Fourth lane addition
In July 2010, the operator, PLUS Expressways, announced that the government had awarded contracts to build a fourth lane on a stretch from Rawang to Jalan Duta. The construction was completed in 2015.

The Kilometre Zero of the entire expressway is located at the Malaysia-Thailand border.

Bukit Kayu Hitam to Sungai Dua, Butterworth 
The expressway begins at the Bukit Kayu Hitam checkpoint in Kedah, where across the border in Thailand the road continues as Phetkasem Road. The expressway proceeds southwards concurrently along the old Federal Route 1, which has not been upgraded and is still a limited-access road. The first grade-separated interchange, which is with route 194, provides access to the northwestern state of Perlis. The route then enters the heart of the town of Changlun, where it intersects with a few local roads with traffic lights. South from the town are several rural villages with residential roads intersecting with the expressway.

Just to the north of the town of Jitra, route 1 continues southwards while the expressway bends southeast to bypass the said town, marking the end of the concurrency and the start of the controlled-access highway proper. Just to the east of the town is the Jitra Toll Plaza, where a one-time payment is made. After the toll plaza the expressway continues southwest, entering the district of Kota Setar and interchanging with route 1 near Kepala Batas. Shortly south is the Hutan Kampung Toll Plaza, where ticket tolling begins. The expressway runs east of the city of Alor Setar, where it makes two interchanges with the Sultanah Bahiyah Highway (route 255), both leading to aforementioned city.

Past the city, route 1 returns to run parallel to the expressway, both running southeasterly to enter the district of Pendang, where the expressway interchanges with a local route leading east to the town of the same name. Proceeding southeast, the expressway enters the Kuala Muda district. It interchanges once in Gurun, bends southwest, then interchanges twice again near Sungai Petani, once to the northeast of the town and once to the southeast. The expressway crosses the bridge over the Muda River, which marks the border between the states of Kedah and Penang. The expressway reaches the town of Bertam, where route 1 deviates westwards from parallelism with the expressway. Further southwest is the Sungai Dua Toll Plaza, where the ticket system ends and the toll-free section begins. The expressway interchanges south of the plaza, just to the west of Sungai Dua. This interchange marks one terminus of the Butterworth Outer Ring Road (expressway 17), which goes west towards Bagan Ajam. After this interchange the expressway widens to six lanes and the urban speed limit of 90 km/h applies. The expressway then crosses the Perai River.

Butterworth and Bandar Baharu 
From this point the expressway enters Seberang Perai Tengah, running southwesterly along the east side of Butterworth, where it makes several important interchanges, including Jalan Permatang Pauh (route 3111) leading to Permatang Pauh, the Butterworth–Kulim Expressway (expressway 15) towards Kulim and Gerik in Kedah, expressway 17 and route 1 in Perai (this is where the other end of E17 is located) as well as the Penang Bridge (expressway 36) towards the island and capital. Here the expressway bends southeast away from the coast, going towards and interchanging at the Perai Industrial Area and Juru. After Juru, the road narrows back to four lanes, followed by the Juru Toll Plaza, where the second ticket system begins. The expressway then enters Seberang Perai Selatan.

The expressway interchanges with route 149 at Bukit Tambun, connecting several industrial areas nearby. Close by at Batu Kawan, the Sultan Abdul Halim Muadzam Shah Bridge (expressway 28) terminates on this expressway, connecting Bandar Cassia as well as the southwest district on the island. The last interchange in Penang is with route 1 at Jawi. The expressway then briefly re-enters the state of Kedah to interchange at Bandar Baharu, serving itself, Parit Buntar just across the border at Perak, as well as the rest of southernmost Kedah.

Alor Pongsu to Ipoh 
Across the Kerian River is the Kerian district in Perak, where a new interchange with route 147 at Alor Pongsu is being constructed. The expressway then briefly winds eastwards, then southwards, to meet Bukit Merah. The expressway continues directly southwards into Larut, Matang dan Selama, interchanging again with route 1 as well as 3146 to the northwest of Taiping. Gently, the expressway winds southeast towards Changkat Jering, where it interchanges with route 60. From here, the expressway heads east through a cutting where the expressway and route 1 briefly run side by side. The route continues towards the district and town of Kuala Kangsar, interchanging at the terminus of route 76, which plies the rural areas of central northern Perak.

At this point route 1 deviates northwards to go around a hill that is part of the Tenasserim Hills cluster. The expressway proceeds towards the hill, going across the Perak River below the Sultan Azlan Shah Bridge. Here, the Ipoh local-express system, constructed in 2008, begins, where all traffic bound for Ipoh or its vicinity is segregated. Southbound commuters entering the local lanes pay the toll/tap out of the ticket system at the Ipoh North Toll Plaza, while northbound motorists merging in from the local lanes collect the ticket/tap into the system. Proceeding southeast through the heart of Ipoh, the expressway's local lanes interchange with several local roads as well as route 1, which begins to run parallel to the expressway again. The system ends to the south of Tambun, where commuters on the southbound local lanes collect their tickets or tap into the system at the Ipoh South Toll Plaza, while northbound motorists entering the local lanes pay their tolls.

Simpang Pulai to Bukit Lanjan 
Leaving the city, the expressway bends southwest to close the gap between the two parallel routes, effectively interchanging with the route at Simpang Pulai. Bending back southeast the expressway interchanges again with route 1 at the town of Gopeng after crossing into the Kampar district. The expressway then cuts through another hill, passing by Gua Tempurung (a cave). The cutting ends in the Batang Padang district just before the next interchange at Tapah with route 59, which connects directly to Cameron Highlands. Heading southwards, the expressway interchanges with a local road at Bidor. Further south within the same district, the expressway interchanges with route 1 thrice – at Sungkai, Slim River and Behrang.

While going southeast, the expressway crosses the Bernam River into the state of Selangor. Despite this, the next interchange, the final one with route 1, mainly serves Tanjung Malim over in the previous state. From this point, route 1 leaves the vicinity of the expressway as the expressway goes southwards and the federal route goes southeast. The expressway interchanges with several rural roads at Lembah Beringin, Bukit Tagar, the Bukit Beruntung industrial area and at Sungai Buaya. Going southwards, the expressway leaves the Hulu Selangor district into the Gombak district, where it interchanges near the Rawang industrial area with route 3209. Shortly after, the Guthrie Corridor Expressway (expressway 35) begins as an interchange on this expressway. On the last segment, the expressway interchanges with a road next to the Sungai Buloh Hospital, crosses into the Petaling district, interchanges with the Sungai Buloh Highway (route 54) at Sungai Buloh, and finally terminates at its interchange with the New Klang Valley Expressway (which is also designated the route number E1) near Segambut in the north-western part of the Federal Territory Kuala Lumpur.

Restricted routes for heavy vehicles 
As the route joins with the New Klang Valley Expressway, a restricted route has been implemented on the North–South Expressway Northern Route between Sungai Buloh and Bukit Lanjan during workdays or peak hours. Heavy vehicles (except buses and tankers) with laden and unladen heavy vehicles weighing 10,000 kg or more are not allowed to enter the expressway between 6:30 am until 9:30 am on Monday to Friday (except public holidays). A compound fine will be issued to heavy vehicles which flout the rule.

Speed limits 
Signed exceptions include:
  when approaching any toll plaza
  on the route 1 concurrency (from Bukit Kayu Hitam to Jitra North) due to the presence of at-grade intersections
  on the Penang toll-free section (from Sungai Dua to Juru) due to heavy urban traffic
  between Kuala Kangsar and Jelapang where the expressway goes uphill, through a tunnel and then downhill
  on the stretch passing through Gua Tempurung, between Gopeng and Tapah.

There are no signed minimum speed limits.

Tolls 

Most of the expressway maintains a ticket system (closed system) of tolling. The expressway however also has two toll plazas using the barrier toll system (open system) at the Bukit Kayu Hitam checkpoint (demolished and takeover by JKR Kedah) and at Jitra. The ticket system from Juru southwards uses an integrated system of tolling that also applies to the New Klang Valley Expressway, North–South Expressway Central Link and North–South Expressway Southern Route; it is possible to travel from Juru on this expressway to Skudai, Johor on the North–South Expressway Southern Route without leaving the toll system. A separate ticket system is in place between Hutan Kampung and Sungai Dua, due to the toll-free section in Penang. The toll rate for the ticket system for passenger cars excluding taxis as of 2011 is 13.6 sen per kilometre. On 1 January 2018, Toll collection at Bukit Kayu Hitam has demolished.

Toll rates

Jitra Toll Plazas

Hutan Kampung-Sungai Dua Toll Plazas

Juru-Sungai Buloh Toll Plazas
Maximum rates from the first toll plaza and the last of the route is shown below:

Services

Emergency assistance and information services 
Orange emergency telephones/callboxes are located every two kilometres along the entire expressway, as with every other expressway in the PLUS expressway network. Alternatively, commuters may dial the toll-free number 1 800 88 0000 on their mobile phones. Both will connect to the PLUS traffic monitoring centre in Subang where commuters may request for traffic information or roadside assistance. The highway patrol and roadside assistance teams are known as PLUSRonda. They provide free first responder services including small fixes for broken down vehicles, towing and also act as traffic police when there is an incident. They are also given auxiliary police powers.

PLUS also provides traffic information to commuters through variable-message signs located on some sections of the expressway, and on Twitter @plustrafik in Malay. Major radio stations in Peninsular Malaysia also broadcast traffic updates for the expressway.

Rest areas 
The North–South Expressway northern route has 12 full rest areas (which includes one overhead bridge restaurant), 23 laybys and one vista point (scenic area) total along both directions of the expressway. Every rest area and layby includes, as a bare minimum, car parks and public toilets. Most laybys also include public telephones and a small rest hut. Depending on location, laybys can also include petrol stations, a surau, and rarely, food courts, independently operated restaurants as well as automated teller machines. Full rest and service areas have all of the above services and are much larger, so they can accommodate more services. Several rest areas also have small inns, and most have complimentary Wi-Fi services. Vista points only have car parks and is meant for commuters to enjoy the scenery at that location. Laybys are found every 25 to 50 kilometres, while full rest areas are found every 80 to 100 kilometres. The only vista point on this expressway is in Ipoh.

History 

The North–South Expressway northern route, being part of the larger North–South Expressway network, was constructed in phases simultaneously with the south section. The first segment on this expressway, from Bukit Kayu Hitam to Jitra, was opened on 1 April 1985, originally as part of Federal Route 1. The first controlled-access highway segment, from Ipoh to Changkat Jering, was opened by the then Sultan of Perak, Azlan Shah on 28 September 1987. The expressway was completed on 5 February 1994 with the opening of the last segment from Juru to Changkat Jering and the opening ceremony for both this expressway and the south section was held on 8 September 1994. The order of construction came under criticism by observers because sections with low traffic were constructed first, while sections with heavy traffic were constructed last.

Events 
Full Electronic Toll Collection in 72 toll plaza from Skudai to Juru on 26 April 2017.

Junction list

Toll-free local-express lanes section (Ipoh North – Ipoh South)

References

External links 

 PLUS Expressway Berhad
 PLUS
 Malaysian Highway Authority

Expressways in Malaysia
North–South Expressway (Malaysia)